Å is a village in the municipality of Åfjord in Trøndelag county, Norway. The village is also called Årnes or Å i Åfjord or just Åfjord. It is the administrative center of the municipality. The lake Stordalsvatnet lies just east of the village.  Åfjord Church is located in Å, just west of the Nordalselva river.

Name
The village is named after the old Aa farm, first referenced in 1329 as "Aom".  The name "Aa" comes from the plural of á which means "(small) river", probably because two rivers run together beneath the farm.  With the Norwegian spelling reforms in the early 20th century, the letter "Aa" was changed to "Å".  On 13 July 1934, the name of the municipality was changed from "Å" to "Åfjord". Since then, the administrative centre in the municipality was referred to as "Å i Åfjord".  On 1 November 1980, the postal service changed the name from "Å i Åfjord" to "Årnes".

See also
List of short place names

References

Villages in Trøndelag
Åfjord